Compass College of Film and Media is a non-profit Christian film college in Grand Rapids, Michigan.  The school changed its name to Compass College of Film and Media from Compass College of Cinematic Arts on January 1, 2022 to better reflect the career paths of the alumni and what the school is teaching its students.

External links
 Official website

Film schools in the United States
Education in Kent County, Michigan
Michigan culture
Non-profit organizations based in Michigan
Education in Grand Rapids, Michigan